The West Indian drywood termite, (Cryptotermes dudleyi), is a species of dry wood termite of the genus Cryptotermes. It is native to Indonesia, Java and exotic to Australia, Trinidad and Tobago and Sri Lanka. It is predominantly a house termite found in natural and man-made wooden structures. Thus, this is the most commonest and most devastating drywood pest termite found in the world. It is a larger termite species, with  length in soldiers.

Description
Imago - General body color is tawny brown. Wings are faintly tinged with brown. Sub-triangular eyes are prominent and large. Antennae composed of 15-18 segments.

Soldier - Head yellowish brown. Antennae are pale yellow-brown in color. Prominent genal horns.

Castes

References

External links
Termites of the Genus Cryptotermes Banks Isoptera: Kalotermitidae from the West Indies
Memoirs: A Species of Proboscidiella From Kalotermes (Cryptotermes) Dudleyi Banks, a Termite of Central America, With Remarks on the Oxymonad Flagellates
A video related to the species Cryptotermes dudleyi 

Termites
Insects described in 1918
Insects of Indonesia
Termites of Sri Lanka